Tracy Reed (born Clare Tracy Compton Pelissier; 21 September 1942 – 2 May 2012) was an English actress.

Early life and education
Reed was the daughter of director Anthony Pelissier and actress Penelope Dudley-Ward; she took the surname of her stepfather, Carol Reed, following her mother's remarriage in 1948. Reed was the granddaughter of actress Fay Compton and producer H. G. Pelissier, and of socialite Freda Dudley Ward and politician William Dudley Ward. Her great-uncle was novelist Sir Compton Mackenzie. Actor Oliver Reed was a step-cousin.

She attended Miss Ironside's School in Kensington.

Career

During a film-acting career that lasted from the early 1960s until 1975, she appeared in about 30 films, the TV series Man of the World (1962), and was at one point under consideration as a replacement for Diana Rigg in The Avengers. In one episode of Dr. Finlay's Casebook in 1967, Reed played opposite Bill Simpson, whom she later married.

Reed is best remembered today for her role as Miss Scott, the mistress of General 'Buck' Turgidson (George C. Scott) in director Stanley Kubrick's film Dr. Strangelove (1964). She has the only female role in that film, and is (principally) seen in only one scene – when she answers the phone while Turgidson is in the bathroom. She is also shown as the centrefold "Miss Foreign Affairs" in the June 1962 copy of Playboy magazine being read by pilot Major T. J. "King" Kong (Slim Pickens) in the B-52. In the photo, she is lying down, apparently nude, with the January 1963 issue of Foreign Affairs – Vol. 41, No. 2, containing Henry Kissinger's suggestive article "Strains on the Alliance" – strategically draped across her buttocks. When asked in 1994 if she had "fond memories" of working on the film, she replied "'Oh yes, lots!'", but "'I was wearing a bikini the whole time,' Reed [remembered], and when Kubrick decided to open the set to the press, 'there were all these reporters staring at me. It was dreadful.'" She again appeared in a feature film starring Peter Sellers, this time in the Blake Edwards comedy A Shot in the Dark (also 1964). Alongside Beau Bridges, Reed also played the madame in Adam's Woman (1970), filmed in Australia.

Later in life, she worked as a gourmet foods company representative in Ireland, travelling the country to persuade shops to sell her employer's products.

Marriages
Reed was four times married:
 Actor Edward Fox (1958–1961; divorced). Their daughter, the former Lucy Fox, now the wife of the 17th Viscount Gormanston, recalled after her mother's death: "she remained close to my father. The marriage was doomed from the start, but they never stopped being close friends. They really loved each other so much."
 Actor Neil Hallett (1970–1973; divorced)
 Actor Bill Simpson (1974–1982; divorced); two daughters
 Christopher McCabe; no children

Death
Reed died of liver cancer in County Cork, Ireland, on 2 May 2012, aged 69; her funeral was held there.

Selected filmography 
 The Way Ahead (1944) (as a baby) as the Perry's Daughter (uncredited)
 Our Man in the Caribbean (1962–1963, TV Series) as Maggie Warren / Maggie / Maggie MacFarlane
 Esther Waters (1964, TV series) as Miss Peggy
 The Main Chance (1964) as Christine
 Dr. Strangelove (1964) as Miss Scott
 A Shot in the Dark (1964) as Dominique Ballon
 Devils of Darkness (1965) as Karen
 You Must Be Joking! (1965) as Poppy Pennington
 Maroc 7 (1967) as Vivienne
 Casino Royale (1967) as Fang Leader
 Hammerhead (1968) as Miss Hull
 Journey to Midnight (1968) as Joyce (episode 'The Indian Spirit Guide')
 Adam's Woman (1970) as Duchess
 Percy (1971) as Mrs. Penney
 Melody (1971) as Woman in hospital
 Fun and Games (1971) as Linda
 U.F.O. 1971, Episode: "The Dalotek Affair") as Jane Carson
 The Deadly Females (1976) as Joan
 Phantom Halo (2014) as Casino Patron (uncredited) (final film role)

References

External links

1942 births
2012 deaths
Actresses from London
English film actresses
English television actresses
English people of French descent
Robin Fox family
Deaths from liver cancer
Deaths from cancer in the Republic of Ireland